Dušan Pajović (born 12 July 1997) is Montenegrin left-wing activist and author. He has been described as "the new striking face on the Montenegrin political scene" and the person of the year in that country, by Le Courrier des Balkans. Pajović is a prominent member of Democracy in Europe Movement 2025.

Democracy in Europe Movement 2025 (DiEM25) 

Dušan Pajović is a coordinator of DiEM25's campaigns and an Ex-Officio member of its Coordinating Collective, highest body of the movement. He has organized or helped in organization of many campaigns including the well known Green New Deal for Europe. Pajović finds DiEM25 as his calling, believing it’s the only valuable radical and realistic alternative that can truly change Europe and the world.

Political thought and activity 

Pajović's areas of interest are Balkan politics with the special focus on Montenegro, analysis of right-wing populism and clericalism rise, post-capitalism economy, degrowth, anarchism and total liberation theory.

He is a regular columnist for the biggest opposition media in Montenegro, Cafe del Montenegro (CdM). His articles can also be found in various media, such as DiEM25 website, Novi plamen, GND Media, Portal Analitika and others. In the past he has collaborated with many different organizations including Humanity & Inclusion, Animal Save Movement, UNICEF and United Nations (UN). His engagement since his teenage years in climate and animal rights activism brought him the experience of knowledge in street actions, advocacy, and social change theory. He has used those skills in his activism, writing, research and interviews.

Although very young, Pajović has already written many opinion piece articles and has appeared in many interviews, podcasts and documentaries with figures such as Noam Chomsky,  Yanis Varoufakis, Jason Hickel, Ann Pettifor, Caroline Lucas, Srećko Horvat and others.

Awards and education 
Dušan Pajović is awarded as the Person of the Year in Montenegro for 2022, by Le Courrier des Balkans. Other than that, he is a recipient of “19th December” student award  by the Capital of Montenegro, and "The Best Student of Generation" by University of Donja Gorica (UDG), where he finished his BSc in applied psychology.

He holds a MSc degree in Psychology of Intercultural Relation as ISCTE – Instituto Universitário de Lisboa alumni.

References 

Montenegrin activists
Montenegrin writers
1997 births
Living people